The 2017 Aussie Racing Car Series is an Australian motor racing series. The category is made up of Silhouette racing cars which use Yamaha FJ1300 engines and Kumho Tyres. James Duckworth is the defending champion.

Teams and drivers

Race calendar
The series was contested over seven rounds with four races at each round.

Series standings

Notes
 The top 3 finisher of Race 1 of Round 1 at the Adelaide Street Circuit (Kel Treseder, Ben Walsh, Jaie Robson) were each awarded 28 seconds time penalties for indiscretions behind the safety car and therefore finished 25th-27th respectively. James Duckworth was awarded the win.
 James Duckworth, Brendon Tucker and Sam Chester were each awarded 5 seconds penalties in Race 2 of Round 1. Duckworth's position went unchanged whilst Tucker and Chester fell from 6th to 7th and 22nd to 23rd respectively.
 Kel Treseder was awarded a 22 seconds penalty in Race 4 of Round 1 for contact with Craig Woods. He fell from 1st to 12th giving James Duckworth the win.
 Kel Treseder set a new lap record for Aussie Racing Cars at the Adelaide Street Circuit during Race 3 beating Paul Kemal record set in 2006 in a Ford Falcon. He later broke his own record in Race 4.

References

Aussie Racing Car